Wetzell is a surname. Notable people with the surname include:

Georg Wetzell (1869–1947), German military officer 
Oskar Wetzell (1888–1928), Finnish Olympic diver
Pippa Wetzell (born 1977), New Zealand television personality and journalist
Richard Wetzell (born 1961), American historian
Stig Wetzell (born 1945), Finnish ice hockey player
Yanni Wetzell (born 1996), New Zealand basketball player

See also
Wetzell-Archbold Farmstead, historic farmhouse in Washington, D.C.
Zebediah F. and Mary H. Wetzell House, historic residence in St. Louis, Missouri
Wetzel (disambiguation)

German-language surnames